Erzsébet Papp (January 28, 1935 – January 23, 1962), known as The Nicotine Killer or her married name "Mrs. János Holhos", was a Hungarian serial killer who poisoned four people with nicotine between 1957 and 1958. She was sentenced to death and subsequently hanged for her crimes in 1962.

Early life 
Erzsébet Papp was born on January 28, 1935, in Penészlek,  one of two daughtes born to farmers János and Julianna Papp (née Krivacs), who also had two sons. According to contemporary accounts, Erzsébet was considered an intelligent woman in comparison with her peers, but was also considered to have a warped sense of morals.

Murders 
All of Papp's killings were carried out using a formula mixing nicotine in tobacco leaves provided by her unsuspecting brother, a fruit grower, and using the concoction on her unsuspecting victims, who were all killed for menial reasons. The first victim was 5-year-old Ilona Tarnóczi in Pereces, who, according to the investigators, had been a victim of opportunity - at the time, Papp was experimenting with her poison, first giving it to a dog and then mixing it in a brandy bottle, which she gave to the little girl. The high amounts of nicotine quickly made Tarnóczi dizzy and unable to walk, making Papp drag her to the road, where Ilona collapsed. When she was found, police quickly wrote off the death as drowning, and closed the case.

Papp's second victim was her best friend, Mrs. József Fürtös, whom she had decided to kill after the former began spreading unsavory rumors about her. In what appeared to be an attempt at reconciliation, she brought Fürtös a bottle of pálinka, which had secretly been laced with nicotine. When Fürtös' body was found, an autopsy was conducted that revealed that she had been pregnant, and her death was written off as a botched abortion attempt. Papp was interrogated on the circumstances of her friend's death, claiming that she had gone to her after she had had a fight with her husband, pointing towards the empty nicotine bottle on the table to back up her claims.

Her third murder was that of her husband István Rostár, an alcoholic who often verbally abused her when he was drunk. In August 1957, Rostár offered that they go to a restaurant in Lillafüred for dinner. When he wasn't looking, Papp poisoned his drinks with nicotine, and due to his alcoholic tendencies, Rostár drank it without a second thought, collapsing not long after. After an autopsy was conducted on the body, the coroner erroneously concluded that the cause of death the result of alcohol poisoning due to the high levels of alcohol in his blood, the strong smell of gastric acid and the discoloration of the gastric mucosa present in alcoholics. Papp, who had gotten pregnant from István with two children, miscarried the first one, while the second child died at three months old after falling from a hay cart.

In 1959, while working at a sovkhoz, Papp met János Holhos, whom she soon married. She tried to poison him as well, but failed, with the angry Holhos beating and then abandoning her, without reporting his wife's attempted murder. After that, she began living with a Romani man, but their relationship was poorly received by her family and friends, who disowned Papp and made her sister, Mrs. Ferenc Juhos, the family heir. Wanting to exact revenge on her family, she went to Nyírbátor, where her sister lived, pouring the nicotine in her glass and successfully killing her. Like the previous murders, it was considered a non-homicidal death in nature.

Arrest 
While she wasn't a suspect in her sister's death, Papp's downfall came when she accidentally placed the brandy bottle on the liquor store shelf, with the shopkeeper selling it to a customer. As a result, two people drank from it, receiving severe poisoning, but managed to survive. Curious about what had caused it, authorities examined the bottle, discovering that it had a lethal dose of nicotine in it. Upon further investigation, it was revealed that the brandy bottle originally belonged to the later widow Erzsébet Papp, who had a suspicious history of close family and friends dying around her. An investigation was launched and the bodies of Tarnóczi, Rostár and her sister were exhumed for testing, confirming the authorities' suspicions that they had been poisoned.

Erzsébet Papp was then arrested and charged with fourfold murder, but then released, as the authorities had insufficient evidence to detain her. This changed during the course of the investigation, as they gathered witness testimony that increasingly weighed in favor of her guilt. Papp was then rearrested and charged anew, and despite initially protesting her innocence, she would eventually break down and confess to all four murders. At trial, Papp was found guilty and sentenced to life imprisonment, but upon appeal to the Curia, she was resentenced to death. On January 23, 1962, she was executed in Miskolc.

See also 
 List of serial killers by country

References

Bibliography 
 

1935 births
1962 deaths
20th-century criminals
Executed Hungarian people
Executed Hungarian female serial killers
Hungarian people convicted of murder
Hungarian prisoners sentenced to life imprisonment
Mariticides
Murderers of children
People executed by Hungary by hanging
People from Szabolcs-Szatmár-Bereg County
Poisoners
Prisoners sentenced to life imprisonment by Hungary
Sororicides